The 2008 Tennessee Lady Volunteers softball team was an American softball team, representing the University of Tennessee for the 2008 NCAA softball season. The team played their home games at Sherri Parker Lee Stadium. The team's season was cut short by Angela Tincher and the Virginia Tech Hokies in the Knoxville Regional, failing to qualify for the Women's College World Series for the first time since 2004.

Roster

Schedule 

|-
!colspan=9| USF Tournament

|-
!colspan=9| Tennessee Classic

|-
!colspan=9| NFCA Leadoff Classic

|-
!colspan=9|

|-
!colspan=9| SEC Tournament

|-
!colspan=9|NCAA Knoxville Regional

References

Tennessee Volunteers softball seasons
Tennessee
Tennessee Volunteers softball season
Tennessee